25N-NBOMe (2C-N-NBOMe, NBOMe-2C-N) is a derivative of the hallucinogen 2C-N. The pharmacological properties of 25N-NBOMe have not been described in the scientific literature, but it is believed to act in a similar manner to related compounds such as 25I-NBOMe and 25C-NBOMe, which are potent agonists at the 5HT2A receptor. 25N-NBOMe has been sold as a street drug and has only been described in the literature in terms of identification by forensic analysis.

Legality
25N-NBOMe is illegal in Alabama, and Hungary.

Sweden
The Riksdag added 25N-NBOMe to Narcotic Drugs Punishments Act under swedish schedule I ("substances, plant materials and fungi which normally do not have medical use") as of January 16, 2015, published by Medical Products Agency (MPA) in regulation LVFS 2014:11 listed as 25N-NBOMe, and 2-(2,5-dimetoxi-4-nitrofenyl)-N-(2-metoxibensyl)etanamin.

United Kingdom

See also
 25B-NBOMe
 25C-NBOMe
 25I-NBOMe
 25TFM-NBOMe

References

25-NB (psychedelics)
Nitro compounds
Designer drugs